Tumor suppressor candidate 3 is a protein that in humans is encoded by the TUSC3 gene.

This gene is a candidate tumor suppressor gene. It is located within a deleted region of a metastatic prostate cancer. The gene is expressed in most nonlymphoid human tissues including prostate, lung, liver, and colon. Expression was also detected in many epithelial tumor cell lines. Two transcript variants encoding distinct isoforms have been identified for this gene.

References

Further reading